The Bunyip, also known by the longer title The Enchantment of Fairy Princess Wattle Blossom, was written by Ella Palzier Campbell (aka Ella Airlie). The pantomime  was a highly successful musical comedy that toured Australia for a decade within Fuller Brothers theatre circuit. The show was produced by Sydney entrepreneur Nat Philips. The premiere of the show ran for at least 97 performances and was revived several times over the following decade.

Production history 
Music was supplied by a number of Australian stage personalities including Vince Courtney, Herbert De Pinna and James Kendis. A Melbourne National Gallery student P. Cohen was enlisted to paint the sets with Australian flowers, namely wattle and waratah, on costumes also.

Venues 
 1916 Grand Opera House, Sydney
 1917 Princess Theatre, Melbourne
 1917 Majestic Theatre, Adelaide
 1918 Brisbane Empire
 1924 Sydney Hippodrome

Synopsis 
The story opens with a bushfire in which all the bush creatures are bought out into the open. Then it deals with the wanderings of princess Wattle Blossom, who falls into the hands of the Bush Gnomes, a proud race with a terrible way of doing things. The Lord High Gnome decrees that the Princess shall be turned into a bunyip, and this transformation takes place on the stage. The fairy princess is then rescued by the principal boy from the race of bush gnomes. A well-received stage effect was a shadow play of girls apparently disrobing behind a backlit screen, over which the (apparently) removed clothing was thrown.

The play relied heavily on comic stereotypes of the time, including a Chinese cook, bumbling Jewish clowns, fierce Aboriginal warriors, and a drunken Australian lout – all contending with Wattle Blossom, the fairy princess in the original story.

Musical numbers
 Bunyip / words & music by Herbert de Pinna
 Wattle blossom time in Australia / words and music by Fred Monument ; arranged by Geo. Hurdle 
 For you / words & music by Marsh Little 
 Nulla nulla / words & music by Marsh Little 
 I love you / words & music by Herbert de Pinna 
 Mean old moon / Ella Airlie 
 Back to Kosciusko / words and music by Ella Airlie   
 Joan / words & music by Marsh Little 
 Bills' enlisted / words by R. Boyer and H. de Pinna ; music by Herbert de Pinna 
 If Captain Cook could come to life to-day / words by Con Moreni ; music by Nellie Kolle & Con Moreni 
 Sonny mine / words & music by Herbert de Pinna 
 Down in Australia / words & music by Marsh Little 
 Nathan : sung by Roy Rene / by James Kendis 
 My Chinee girl : the favourite one-step song / words and music by Vince Courtney 
 Grey hair grey eyes / words by Nat Phillips ; music by Bert Reid 
 Safety first / words and music by Henry T. Hayes – Dancers drilled by a child actor
 Mother waratah / words & music by Marsh Little 
 Bunyip waltzes / arr. by Albert Evelyn 
 Pierrot and Pierrette / lyric by Jean Lenox and Ray Sterling ; music by Leo Edwards 
 Swinging along to Henty / words & music by Henry B. Hayes ; ukulele arr. by P. P. McGrath using Bishaw's method  
 All I want is a cottage, some roses, and you / by Chas. K. Harris

Characters

 Wattle Blossom – a fairy princess
 Wattle Blossom's attendant
 Chief Gnome
 Joan – principal 'girl'
 Jack – principal 'boy'
 Squatter Hadfield
 Mrs Wiggins
 Ah Fat (Chinese cook) played by Vince Courtney
 Swaggie swagman
 Extras – An Aboriginal corroboree and bush sprite dancers
 Arthur – a halfwit
 Tower – a lofty fellow
Comedy duo 'Stiffy and Mo'

Cast
The cast changed across several venues. For example, in Adelaide the crowd was treated to a boomerang thrower safely tossing weapons above their heads
Nat Philips (producer) and Roy Rene played Stiffy and Mo.
 Peter Brooks originally played the Swaggie, but was replaced by drag Swagman impersonator Nellie Kolle.
 Villiers Arnold played the Gnome in the Sydney production at the grand opera house
 Pearl Ladd played the bunyip at the Sydney performance
 Ella Airlie (the writer) played Jack the principal boy opposite Queenie Pearl as Joan the principal female lead. Dan Dunbar and Zoe Wencke joined the team later.
 Roy Rene continued the comic character 'Mo' he had developed in vaudeville
 Caddie Franks played the transformation into a Bunyip

Critical reception
The play was embraced with patriotic fervour. From 1917, the show drew crowded houses. The theme song was adopted by schools in New South Wales and sales of the sheet music were phenomenal.

The press was unaffected by a typical Australian workers dispute between management and two stage hands who objected to the behaviour of a backstage colleague.

References

1924 musicals
Australian musicals
Pantomime
Plays set in the 1900s
Plays set in Australia
Teen musicals